The 46th New York Film Festival ran from September 26 to October 12, 2008. In addition to screening the feature films listed below, which were often preceded by short films, the festival ran a sidebar retrospective of the films of controversial Japanese director Nagisa Oshima. The festival also included its twelfth annual series Views from the Avant-Garde, showcasing a variety of experimental films.

Main slate

Selection committee 
Richard Peña, programming director of the Film Society of Lincoln Center
Kent Jones, editor-at-large of Film Comment and former associate programming director of the Film Society
Scott Foundas, chief film critic for L.A. Weekly
J. Hoberman, senior film critic at The Village Voice
Lisa Schwarzbaum, film critic at Entertainment Weekly

External links
 

New York Film Festival, 2008
New York Film Festival, 2008
2008 in New York City
New York Film Festival